Raccoon Creek is a tributary of the Ohio River in Beaver County, Pennsylvania. Raccoon Creek joins the Ohio River in Potter Township. Only a small portion of the creek is located within Raccoon Creek State Park. The stream within the park is Little Traverse Creek.

See also
List of rivers of Pennsylvania

References

External links
 
U.S. Geological Survey: PA stream gaging stations

Rivers of Beaver County, Pennsylvania
Rivers of Pennsylvania
Tributaries of the Ohio River